State Road 371 (NM 371) is a  state highway in the US state of New Mexico. NM 371's southern terminus is at Interstate 40 (I-40) and NM 612 in Thoreau, and the northern terminus is at U.S. Route 64 (US 64) in Farmington.

Major intersections

See also

References

371
Transportation in McKinley County, New Mexico
Transportation in San Juan County, New Mexico
Farmington, New Mexico